Cyphella is a genus of fungi in the family Cyphellaceae. A 2008 estimate placed about 300 species in the widely distributed genus.

References

External links

Cyphellaceae
Agaricales genera
Taxa named by Elias Magnus Fries
Taxa described in 1822